Slimane Saoudi (Arabic: سليمان سعودي) (born 23 July 1975) is a former professional Algerian tennis player.

Saoudi reached his highest individual ranking on the ATP Tour on 21 July 2003, when he became World No. 212.  His only appearance at a Grand Slam came at the 2002 U.S. Open, where he reached the main draw as a qualifier, losing in the first round in five sets to fellow qualifier Ivo Heuberger of Switzerland.  He played primarily on the Futures circuit.

Saoudi was a member of the Algeria Davis Cup team until 2009,  posting a 5-11 record in singles and a 3-6 record in doubles.  He first played Davis Cup only in 2005.

Career titles

External links
 
 
 

1975 births
Living people
Algerian male tennis players
Mediterranean Games silver medalists for Algeria
Competitors at the 2005 Mediterranean Games
African Games gold medalists for Algeria
African Games medalists in tennis
Universiade medalists in tennis
Mediterranean Games medalists in tennis
Competitors at the 2007 All-Africa Games
Universiade bronze medalists for France
Medalists at the 1999 Summer Universiade
Islamic Solidarity Games medalists in tennis
Islamic Solidarity Games competitors for Algeria
21st-century Algerian people